Massachusetts's 9th congressional district is located in eastern Massachusetts. It is represented by Democrat William R. Keating. The 9th district is the least Democratic congressional district in Massachusetts, according to the Cook Partisan Voting Index.

Redistricting after the 2010 census eliminated Massachusetts's 10th congressional district; the 9th covers much of the old 10th's eastern portion. The district also added some Plymouth County communities from the old 4th district, and some Bristol County communities from the old 3rd and 4th districts. It eliminated a few easternmost Norfolk County communities and northernmost Plymouth County communities.

From 1963 to 2013, the 9th covered most of southern Boston, and in its latter years, it included many of Boston's southern suburbs. Most of that territory is now the 8th district.

Election results from presidential races

Cities and towns in the district 

All of Barnstable County, Dukes County, and Nantucket County.

The following municipalities in Bristol County:
Acushnet, Dartmouth, Fairhaven, Fall River: Wards 1–3, Ward 6, Precincts A and B in Ward 4, Precincts A and B in Ward 5, New Bedford, and Westport.

The following municipalities in Plymouth County:
Carver, Duxbury, Halifax, Hanover, Hanson, Kingston, Marion, Marshfield, Mattapoisett, Middleborough, Norwell, Pembroke, Plymouth, Plympton, Rochester, Rockland, and Wareham.

Cities and towns in the district prior to 2013

1840s

1849: "The towns in the County of Plymouth, excepting Abington, Hingham, Hull, North Bridgewater, Rochester, and Wareham; and all the towns in the County of Bristol, excepting Dartmouth, Fairhaven, and New Bedford."

1860s

1862: "The towns of Ashburnham, Auburn, Barre, Boylston, Brookfield, Charlton, Clinton, Douglas, Dudley, Fitchburg, Gardner, Grafton, Holden, Hubbardston, Lancaster, Leicester, Leominster, Millbury, New Braintree, North Brookfield, Oakham, Oxford, Paxton, Princeton, Rutland, Shrewsbury, Southbridge, Spencer, Sterling, Sturbridge, Sutton, Templeton, Webster, West Boylston, Westminster, and Winchendon, and the city of Worcester, in the county of Worcester."

1870s–1880s

1890s

1893: Boston, Wards 1, 2, 3, 6, 7, 8, 12, 16, 17, 18, 19 (Precincts 2, 3, 4, 6); Winthrop.

1900s

1910s

1916: In Middlesex County: Everett, Malden, Somerville. In Suffolk County: Chelsea, Revere, Winthrop.

1920s–1940s

1950s

1953: "Counties: Barnstable, Dukes, and Nantucket. Bristol County: City of Fall River, ward 6, and city of New Bedford; towns of Acushnet, Dartmouth, Fairhaven, and Westport. Norfolk County: Town of Cohasset. Plymouth County: Towns of Abington, Bridgewater, Carver, Duxbury, East Bridgewater, Halifax, Hanover, Hanson, Hingham, Hull, Kingston, Lakeville, Marion, Marshfield, Mattapoisett, Middleborough, Norwell, Pembroke, Plymouth, Plympton, Rochester, Rockland, Scituate, Wareham, West Bridgewater, and Whitman."

1960s

1963: Boston (Wards 4- 17, 19, 20).

1970s

1977: "Norfolk County: Towns of Canton, Dedham, Dover, Needham, Norwood, Walpole, and Westwood. Suffolk County: City of Boston: Wards 3, 4, 6—14, 19, and 20."

1980s

1985: "Bristol County: City of Taunton. Towns of Dighton, Easton, and Raynham. Norfolk County: Towns of Canton, Dedham, Needham, Norwood, Stoughton, and Westwood. Plymouth County: Towns of Bridgewater, Halifax, Lakeville, and Middleborough. Suffolk County: City of Boston: Wards 3, 6–14, 19, and 20."

2003–2013 
In Bristol County:
Easton.

In Norfolk County:
Avon, Braintree, Canton, Dedham, Holbrook, Medfield, Milton, Needham, Norwood, Randolph, Stoughton, Walpole, Westwood.

In Plymouth County:
Bridgewater, Brockton, East Bridgewater, Hanson, Precincts 1 and 3, West Bridgewater, Whitman.

In Suffolk County:
Boston, Ward 3, Precincts 5 and 6; Ward 5, Precincts 3–5, 11; Ward 6; Ward 7, Precincts 1–9; Ward 13, Precincts 3, 7–10; Ward 15, Precinct 6; Ward 16, Precincts 2, 4–12; Ward 17, Precincts 4, 13, 14; Ward 18, Precincts 9–12, 16–20, 22, 23; Ward 19, Precincts 2, 7, 10–13; Ward 20.

List of members representing the district

Election results

2012

2014

2016

2018

2020

References

 
 
 Congressional Biographical Directory of the United States 1774–present

Further reading

External links

Maps 
 Map of Massachusetts's 9th Congressional District, via Massachusetts Secretary of the Commonwealth

Election results 
 CNN.com 2004 election results
 CNN.com 2006 election results

09
Government of Bristol County, Massachusetts
Government of Norfolk County, Massachusetts
Government of Plymouth County, Massachusetts
Government of Suffolk County, Massachusetts
1795 establishments in Massachusetts
Constituencies established in 1795